Albert Ferreros del Rosario (born November 14, 1939) is a Filipino diplomat. He was the Secretary of Foreign Affairs of the Philippines from 2011 to 2016.

Background
Albert del Rosario was born in Manila on November 14, 1939, to Luis del Rosario and Amparo Ferreros. His great grandmother Teresa Sempio was a sister of Felipa Sempio, the mother of Gregorio del Pilar. His grandfather, Judge Simplicio Sempio del Rosario, was a delegate to the Malolos Congress.

Del Rosario graduated from Xavier High School in New York and subsequently attended college at New York University, graduating with a degree in Economics. In 2006, he was inducted into the Xavier High School Hall of Fame.  

Before being appointed by Benigno Aquino III to the Secretary of Foreign Affairs post, del Rosario was the Philippine Ambassador to the United States under then-President Gloria Macapagal Arroyo from 2001 to 2006. He stepped down after disagreements with the Arroyo government.  He reportedly opposed the hiring of more lobby groups for the Philippine government and had cautioned the Arroyo government on its move to declare emergency rule in 2006, following reported threats to national security.

In 2008, he wrote that he could not defend the emergency rule to Washington since it was "unjustifiable".

On September 15, 2014, del Rosario was awarded the Tanging Dangal Award (Gawad Dangal na Lipi), the highest recognition given to a Bulakenyo who demonstrated outstanding contributions to society. del Rosario's family hails from Bulakan, Bulacan.

On September 24, 2015, he was conferred an honorary Doctor of Laws degree (Honoris Causa)  from New York's  College of Mount Saint Vincent for his commitment to democracy, advocacy to the poor, opposing corruption and promoting peaceful change in the Philippines. In his acceptance speech, del Rosario said,

“As an official of the Philippine government, I am truly humbled to be honored after President Corazon Aquino, a Mount alumna. Thus, the honorary Doctor of Laws that the Mount has conferred upon me will always be my treasure as well as my inspiration. The Philippine Department of Foreign Affairs that I lead closely shares Mount Saint Vincent’s commitment to institutional integrity and excellence. I, therefore, consider the honor bestowed on me as recognition also for the hardworking men and women of the Philippine Foreign Service.”

Ties with the Aquinos
His ties with the Aquino family go back to President Aquino's parents. When the late Corazon Aquino was president for 6 years starting in 1986, he accompanied her on her state visits to the United States.

In 1991, Aquino conferred the Philippine Army Award to del Rosario for his initiatives as Chair of the Makati Foundation for Education.

Secretary of Foreign Affairs
On February 24, 2011, President Benigno Aquino III swore in del Rosario as his Secretary of Foreign Affairs replacing Alberto Romulo. In May 2012, del Rosario called on the United States to supply the Philippines with "naval patrol vessels, aircraft, advanced radar systems and coastal surveillance facilities" in order to maintain his nation's sovereignty against Chinese claims in the South China Sea.

On March 30, 2014,  the Philippines submitted its country's Memorial to the Arbitral Tribunal in the Hague that is hearing the case it brought against the People's Republic of China under the United Nations Convention on the Law of the Sea. The Memorial seeks to have China's claim of 90% of the South China Sea, including several features within the Philippine Exclusive Economic Zone, declared invalid. The case would be the first time international legal experts formally considered the validity of China's territorial claims in the South China Sea. 
Del Rosario stated

" With firm conviction, the ultimate purpose of the Memorial is our national interest. It is about defending what is legitimately ours. It is about securing our children’s future. It is about guaranteeing freedom of navigation for all nations. It is about helping to preserve regional peace, security and stability. And finally, it is about seeking not just any kind of resolution but a just and durable solution grounded in International Law."

On July 7, 2015, del Rosario appeared before the Arbitral Tribunal in the Hague to present "Why the Philippines brought this case to Arbitration and its importance to the region and the world".

On February 8, 2016, del Rosario announced that he would resign as Secretary of Foreign Affairs, citing health reasons. He stepped down on March 7, 2016, nearly four months before the end of President Aquino's term.

References

External links

 Albert del Rosario on Yahoo! News
 Albert del Rosario on South China Morning Post
 Albert del Rosario on Reuters
 

Living people
People from Manila
Secretaries of Foreign Affairs of the Philippines
Ambassadors of the Philippines to the United States
1939 births
Xavier High School (New York City) alumni
Benigno Aquino III administration cabinet members